Joseph Brennan (18 November 1887 – 19 March 1976) was an Irish economist and senior Irish civil servant who served as the Governor of the Central Bank of Ireland from 1943 to 1953.

Brennan was born in Cork in 1887, but was a native of Bandon, County Cork. In 1909, he entered Christ Church, Cambridge, where he studied Mathematics and then switched to classics. In successive years he obtained a first in Latin and Greek. In 1911, he entered the Civil Service and was assigned to the Board of Customs and Excise and a year later transferred to the finance division of the Chief Secretary's office in Dublin Castle.

During the July 1921 Truce, he was introduced to Michael Collins and later became a financial advisor to the team negotiating the Anglo-Irish Treaty.

In April 1922, he became the Irish Free State's first Comptroller and Auditor General and in April of the following year he was appointed Secretary of the Department of Finance, a post he held until his retirement from the Civil Service in 1927. Later that year he was appointed Chairman of the Currency Commission.

In 1925, his lengthy note on the Free State's financial position was helpful in concluding the Irish Boundary Commission negotiations.

When the Currency Commission was dissolved in 1943, he became the  first Governor of the Central Bank of Ireland. From 1928 until his retirement in 1953 his signature appeared on all Irish Banknotes.

In 1938, Joseph Brennan was conferred with an Honorary LLD by the National University of Ireland. He died in 1976.

Notes

Biography 
 No Man's Man: A Biographical Memoir of Joseph Brennan, by Leon O Broin
Hardcover, Institute of Public Administration,  (0-906980-20-8)

1887 births
1976 deaths
Irish civil servants
Civil servants in Ireland (1801–1922)
People from County Cork
Governors of the Central Bank of Ireland
20th-century Irish civil servants